"Apple Shampoo" is a song by American rock band Blink-182, released on April 14, 1997, in Australia as the first single from the group's second studio album, Dude Ranch (1997). The song was released as a single in Australia only, through an exclusive license with Mushroom Records imprint label Rapido.

Background
The song, which regards a failing relationship, was inspired by the end of Mark Hoppus' relationship with Elyse Rogers of the ska punk band Dance Hall Crashers, with whom Blink toured in 1996. The song's title came from Rogers' favorite type of shampoo. Hoppus said, "[Rogers] always smelt like apple shampoo and that's why I named it 'Apple Shampoo' [be]cause it's about her. It would've been really bad form to name the song 'Elyse from Dance Hall Crashers'."

Composition
The song is composed in the key of C major and is set in time signature of common time with a fast tempo of 216 beats per minute. Hoppus's vocal range spans from G4 to A5.

Release
"Apple Shampoo" was released as the band set out on the Australian leg of the Warped Tour 1997. The song was an Australian-only single release celebrating the tour and their fanbase in Australia, which had grown considerably since 1995. The single peaked at number 90 on the Australian singles chart in April 1997.

Format and track listing 
CD (1997)
 "Apple Shampoo" – 2:54
 "Voyeur" – 2:46
 "Good Times" – 1:04

Personnel 
Blink-182
 Mark Hoppus – bass, lead vocals
 Tom DeLonge – guitar, backing vocals
 Scott Raynor – drums

Production
Mark Trombino – production, recording, mixing
Brian Gardner – mastering

Chart positions

Weekly charts

References

Notes

Blink-182 songs
1997 songs
1997 singles
Songs written by Mark Hoppus
Songs written by Tom DeLonge